Kasibugga is a town of Palasa in Srikakulam district of the Indian state of Andhra Pradesh. It is a municipality and the part in mandal  of Palasa .

Geography 
Kasibugga is located at 18° 45' 33N 84° 24' 58E. It has an average elevation of 38 meters (127 feet).

Politics
Kasibugga is comes under Palasa (Assembly constituency) and the urban local body is ruled by Palasa-Kasibugga Municipality.

Transport 
Kasibugga is well connected with major cities in Visakhapatnam region and other cities and towns in Telangana and Odisha.

References

External links 

Cities and towns in Srikakulam district